Cyta is a genus of snout mites in the family Bdellidae. There are about 15 described species in Cyta.

Species
 Cyta americana Banks, 1902
 Cyta brevipalpa Ewing, 1909
 Cyta coerulipes (Dugès, 1834)
 Cyta flava Mihelcic, 1958
 Cyta grandjeani Gomelauri, 1963
 Cyta ignea (Tseng, 1978)
 Cyta kauaiensis Swift & Goff, 1987
 Cyta latirostris (Hermann, 1804)
 Cyta longiseta Wallace & Mahon, 1972
 Cyta magdalenae Den Heyer, 1981
 Cyta murrayi Den Heyer, 1981
 Cyta quadrisetosus Den Heyer, 1981
 Cyta reticulata Soliman & Zaher, 1975
 Cyta spuria Atyeo, 1960
 Cyta troglodyta Hernandes, Bernardi & Ferreira, 2011

References

Further reading

 
 
 

Trombidiformes genera
Taxa named by Carl von Heyden